The Little River is a  tributary of the Androscoggin River in the U.S. state of Maine. It forms the boundary between Sagadahoc and Androscoggin counties.

The Little River rises near West Bowdoin at the junction of Fisher Stream and Purington Brook and flows south, joining the Androscoggin River just east of Lisbon Falls. The river forms the boundary between the town of Lisbon in Androscoggin County to the west and the towns of Bowdoin and Topsham in Sagadahoc County to the east.

See also
List of rivers of Maine

References

USGS Geographic Names Information Service
Maine Streamflow Data from the USGS
Maine Watershed Data From Environmental Protection Agency

Tributaries of the Kennebec River
Rivers of Androscoggin County, Maine
Rivers of Sagadahoc County, Maine
Lisbon, Maine
Topsham, Maine
Rivers of Maine